Grevillea kedumbensis is a species of flowering plant in the family Proteaceae and is endemic to a restricted locale in the Great Dividing Range in central New South Wales in Australia. It is a twiggy shrub with narrowly elliptic to egg-shaped leaves with the narrower end towards the base, and clusters of hairy green to cream-coloured flowers.

Description
The upper surface of the leaves is grainy and the lower surface covered with silky hairs. Flowering mainly occurs in winter and spring, though can occur at other times of year.

Taxonomy
First collected by Alec Blombery in the Kedumba Valley in 1986, this grevillea was first formally described in 1986 by Donald McGillivray, who gave it the name Grevillea obtusiflora subsp. kedumbensis in his New names in Grevillea (Proteaceae). In 1994, Peter M. Olde and Neil R. Marriott raised the subspecies to species level as Grevillea kedumbensis in the journal Telopea.

Distribution and habitat
Grevillea kedumbensis grows in dry forest and is restricted to the area between the Kedumba Valley below Katoomba and Scotts Main Range near Yerranderie.

References

kedumbensis
Flora of New South Wales
Proteales of Australia
Plants described in 1986
Taxa named by Donald McGillivray